U.S. Highway 2 (US 2) is a United States Numbered Highway in northwest and northeast Minnesota, which runs from the Red River at East Grand Forks and continues east to Duluth, where the route crosses the Richard I. Bong Memorial Bridge over the Saint Louis Bay. The route connects the cities of East Grand Forks, Bemidji, Grand Rapids, and Duluth.

Route description

US 2 enters the state from the west at the city of East Grand Forks, at the Red River. Upon entering Crookston, US 2 follows the city streets of North Main, North Broadway, and East Robert streets.

This expressway portion of US 2 in northwest Minnesota passes through the cities of Mentor, Erskine, Fosston, Bagley, and the west of Bemidji.

The freeway crosses the Mississippi River after .

The freeway ends at an at-grade junction with Animal Land Drive south of Bemidji. The portion of US 2 from Bemidji to Cass Lake is officially designated the Paul Bunyan Expressway.

East of Deer River, US 2 is a four-lane divided highway for  until the city of Grand Rapids, where it has a junction with US 169. US 2 then continues southeasterly for  before entering the city of Proctor, where it is the main street through town. The route widens to a three-lane roadway as it approaches its intersection with Boundary Avenue (County Road 14 [CR 14]). The route enters the city limits of Duluth, where it has a junction with Interstate 35 (I-35), US 2 joins that route's freeway. US 2 then exits the I-35 freeway in West Duluth and crosses the Richard I. Bong Memorial Bridge over the Saint Louis Bay, entering the state of Wisconsin and the city of Superior. US 2 then follows Belknap Street in Superior.

Legally, the Minnesota section of US 2 is defined as Constitutional Route 8 and Legislative Route 106 in the Minnesota Statutes §§ 161.114(2) and 161.115(134). The route is not marked with those numbers.

History
US 2 in Minnesota was authorized on November 11, 1926. It followed the route of old state Trunk Highway 8 in its entirety. At the time it was marked, it was paved along a short concurrency with US 75 north of Crookston and from its junction with then-Trunk Highway 11 (present-day US 53) through Duluth. The remainder was graveled or graded, except for a section west of Bagley which was simply a maintained dirt surface.

The route in Minnesota was completely paved in 1939. The last segment to be completed was between then-State Highway 94 (now MN 194) at Solway Township and the community of Adolph.

A few short (four-lane) divided highway segments of US 2 were constructed west of Bemidji during the 1960s. In the present day, from East Grand Forks to Cass Lake, this route is built to expressway standards and a posted  speed limit. The highway from Bemidji to Cass Lake was designated the Paul Bunyan Expressway in 1991. That designation originally extended down MN 371 to Little Falls, but that section was repealed in 2005.

From Cass Lake to Duluth, there are only a couple of short four-lane divided highway segments, but the nonurban portions of this segment are a posted  speed limit.

Major intersections

References

External links

Highway 2 at the Unofficial Minnesota Highways Page

02
 Minnesota
Transportation in Polk County, Minnesota
Transportation in St. Louis County, Minnesota
Transportation in Aitkin County, Minnesota
Transportation in Itasca County, Minnesota
Transportation in Cass County, Minnesota
Transportation in Beltrami County, Minnesota
Transportation in Clearwater County, Minnesota
Transportation in Hubbard County, Minnesota
002